Albacutya is a locality in western Victoria, Australia within the Shire of Hindmarsh local government area. The locality surrounds the shores of Lake Albacutya. 

Albacatya is one of many places located on the Wimmera Mallee Silo Art Trail with Silo art created in 2021 by Kitt Bennett.

References

External links

Towns in Victoria (Australia)